A esmorga is a 2014 Galician-language Spanish film directed by Ignacio Vilar. The film is adapted from the book A esmorga by Galician author Eduardo Blanco Amor.

Cast
Miguel de Lira as Cibrán
Karra Elejalde as Bocas
Antonio Durán "Morris" as Milhomes
Alfonso Agra as Pego
Sabela Arán as Socorrito
Melania Cruz as Raxada
Lois Soaxe as Acacio
Santi Prego as Cabito
Pepo Suevos as Barrigas
Covadonga Berdiñas as Tía Esquilacha
Mela Casal as Nonó
Mónica García as Costilleta
Amelia Guede as Amelia
Elena Seijo as Cupatrás
Fina Calleja as Piolla
Ledicia Sola as Viguesa
Patxi Bisquert as Señor de Andrade
Monti Castiñeiras as Cabaleiro
Yago López as Lisardiño

References

External links
 
 

2014 films
Galician-language films
Galicia (Spain) in fiction
Films about alcoholism
Spanish LGBT-related films
2010s Spanish films